Stanislav (Ukrainian: Станіслав) is a village in Kherson Raion western Kherson Oblast, Ukraine, with a population of around 4,724 inhabitants.  It hosts the administration of Stanislav rural hromada, one of the hromadas of Ukraine.

Geography
The Village is located on the right bank of the Dnieper–Bug estuary.

History 
Until 18 July, 2020, Stanislav belonged to Bilozerka Raion. The raion was abolished in July 2020 as part of the administrative reform of Ukraine, which reduced the number of raions of Kherson Oblast to five. The area of Bilozerka Raion was merged into Kherson Raion.

Stanislav came under Russian occupation during the 2022 Russian Invasion of Ukraine. On November 10, Ukrainian forces liberated the town.

References

Villages in Kherson Raion